Shaw Yacht Design is a design company known for high-performance sportsboats and small keelboats. The principal designer is Rob Shaw, a lecturer in Marine Technology at Unitec's Department of Transport Technology in Auckland.

Shaw Yacht Design designs micro boats. Rob Shaw's boat Karma Police (Shaw 9) and its sister ships Deep Throttle and the Shaw 10 Orbit took the first three places on handicap in the HSBC Coastal Classic 2010, outperforming far larger boats. Karma Police, sailed by Shaw and Ben Costello, went on to finish second on line and PHRF in the 2011 "Round the North Island" two-handed race.

According to the RaceTrack online yacht performance database, Shaw 10 Orbit was ranked 10th, Shaw 9 Karma Police 14th, and Shaw 7.5 Animal Biscuits 19th-fastest keelboat in New Zealand.

The Shaw 650 sportsboat is available as a production boat.

Designs
 Shaw 550: Trailer sailer compliant asymmetric sports boat, capable of sailing with crew of 2/3 with twin rudders.
 Shaw 650: Winged Asymmetric Sports boat.
 Shaw 650 Turbo: 4 trapeze and larger rigged version of the 650.
 Shaw 7 and 750: Sports boats with large racks, looking more like a skiff than a keel boat.
 Shaw 8 More conventional sports boat, with a fixed keel and outboard motor in a well.
 Shaw 9: Canting keel yacht capable of short handed coastal/offshore racing.
 Shaw 950: Fixed keel cruiser/racer yacht capable of club/offshore racing.
 Shaw 10: Flushed decked canting keel yacht.
 Shaw 10.6CR: A cruiser/racer with a canting keel.
 Shaw 11: A racer with a canting keel, developed from the Shaw 9m (there are both an inshore and offshore variants).
 Shaw 12: A racer with a canting keel, developed from the Shaw 11m.

External links
 Shaw Yacht Design Website

Notes

Yacht design firms